Vivien Keszthelyi  (born 7 December 2000) is a Hungarian racing driver who started her career at the age of 13. She is a member of the Audi Sport Racing Academy.

Keszthelyi started her professional career in 2014, in the Suzuki Swift Cup Europe series. She became the youngest and only female member of Audi Sport Racing Academy in 2015, also becoming the first Hungarian racing driver with factory connection. In 2016, she won her first races in an Audi TT in the Central European Zone Trophy, where she won both the sprint and the endurance categories.

In 2017, Keszthelyi became the youngest Hungarian point scorer in international series, when she competed in the Audi Sport TT Cup. In 2018, she finished second in the Audi Sport R8 Cup, making her the youngest female racing driver in the international GT4 championships to finish the season in the top 3.

Career
When she first raced in an international competition, she finished third in the absolute and second in the junior category during the racing weekend at the Hungaroring. She was able to enter the Swift Cup Europe series with a special license, which was essential for her to compete at the international level at her age. At the end of the season, she finished third in the junior and sixth in the overall standings. The promoter of Swift Cup Austria invited her to one of the races of the competition, where she finished 4th.

In her second season in the Swift Cup Europe she finished third in the absolute and second in the junior category. In 2016 she was included into the Audi Sport Racing Academy at the age of 15 among the three drivers chosen to be members of the academy.

Keszthelyi then competed in the Central European Zone Trophy with an Audi TT. In her first season she became the D-2000 Hungarian national champion of both the sprint and the endurance category.

In 2017, Keszthelyi continued in the Audi TT Cup where she only completed 7 out of 13 races. She collected 65 points and finished 13th in the championship.

In 2018 Keszthelyi competed in the Audi Sport Seyffarth R8 LMS Cup with an Audi R8 LMS GT4. The 17-year-old delivered consistent performances throughout the season. Over the course of the season she collected 3 podiums. At the end of the season she was crowned vice-champion overall and champion of the rookie category.

On 2 January 2019, it was confirmed that Keszthelyi would race in the F3 Asian Championship Winter Series. She scored 13 points and finished 13th.

Keszthelyi qualified for W Series as one of two reserve drivers.  Vivien Keszthelyi replaced Emma Kimilainen in the 2nd round at Zolder and the 3rd round at Misano where she scored her only point of the season. Normally a reserve driver, she was promoted to regular driver duties at Round 4 and Round 6.

In 2020, she tested the Dallara 320 with Carlin Motorsport and Motopark.

In 2021, she competed in the Euroformula Open Championship with Motopark. The 20-year-old was the first Hungarian to race in the competition.

Racing record

Career summary

* Season still in progress.

Complete Audi Sport Seyffarth R8 LMS Cup results
(key) (Races in bold indicate pole position) (Races in italics indicate fastest lap)

Complete F3 Asian Winter Series results
(key) (Races in bold indicate pole position) (Races in italics indicate fastest lap)

Complete W Series results
(key) (Races in bold indicate pole position) (Races in italics indicate fastest lap)

Complete Euroformula Open Championship results 
(key) (Races in bold indicate pole position; races in italics indicate points for the fastest lap of top ten finishers)

References

Hungarian racing drivers
W Series drivers
2000 births
Living people
F3 Asian Championship drivers
Audi Sport TT Cup drivers
Euroformula Open Championship drivers
Motopark Academy drivers
BlackArts Racing drivers
Hungarian female racing drivers